Miguel Antonio Mosna (born June 7, 1962, in Merlo, Buenos Aires) is a light heavyweight Argentine boxer who fought in various events around the world. The bulk of his career has been in Argentina but he has also fought in Las Vegas, Niger, South Africa, Brazil, Venezuela and other countries.
He retired from boxing with a total of:   
 11 fights won by K.O
 6 fights lost by K.O
 1 fight ending with a draw

He is recognized among such famous Argentine boxers as Juan Roldan, Oscar Bonavena and Carlos Monzón.

References
Google News
Cyber Boxing Zone
Cyber Boxing Zone
Hickok Sports
Fabox
Boxrec
Boxing at the 1983 Pan American Games

1962 births
Living people
Boxers at the 1983 Pan American Games
Pan American Games bronze medalists for Argentina
Argentine male boxers
Pan American Games medalists in boxing
Light-heavyweight boxers
Medalists at the 1983 Pan American Games